KBYS may refer to:

 KBYS (FM), a radio station (88.3 FM) licensed to serve Lake Charles, Louisiana, United States
 Bicycle Lake Army Airfield (ICAO code KBYS)